Tokaloo Rock is a  mountain located in Mount Rainier National Park, in Pierce County of Washington state. The Wonderland Trail provides an approach to this mountain, and the summit offers views of Mount Rainier's Puyallup and Tahoma glaciers. Glacier Island is its nearest higher neighbor,  to the southeast.

History
Tokaloo Rock's name was officially adopted in 1932 by the United States Board on Geographic Names.

Climate

Mineral Mountain is located in the marine west coast climate zone of western North America. Most weather fronts originate in the Pacific Ocean, and travel northeast toward the Cascade Mountains. As fronts approach, they are forced upward by the peaks of the Cascade Range (Orographic lift), causing them to drop their moisture in the form of rain or snowfall onto the Cascades. As a result, the west side of the Cascades experiences high precipitation, especially during the winter months in the form of snowfall. During winter months, weather is usually cloudy, but, due to high-pressure systems over the Pacific Ocean that intensify during summer months, there is often little or no cloud cover during the summer.

See also

 Geology of the Pacific Northwest

References

External links
 National Park Service web site: Mount Rainier National Park

Cascade Range
Mountains of Pierce County, Washington
Mountains of Washington (state)
Mount Rainier National Park